Bullion is an unincorporated community in Adair County, in the U.S. state of Missouri.

History
A post office called Bullion was established in 1882, and remained in operation until 1904. The community was named after C. H. Bull, a railroad promoter.

References

Unincorporated communities in Adair County, Missouri
1882 establishments in Missouri
Populated places established in 1882
Unincorporated communities in Missouri